This is a list of college football coaches with 200 career wins. "College level" is defined as a four-year college or university program in either the National Association of Intercollegiate Athletics (NAIA) or the National Collegiate Athletic Association (NCAA). If a team competed at a time before the official organization of either of the two groups but is generally accepted as a "college football program", it is included.

Historical overview
As of the end of the 2022 season, a total of 98 head football coaches have reached the milestone of 200 career coaching wins.

In the 100 years after the first college football game in 1869, only eight coaches reached the 200-win milestone. The only two who reached the mark before 1950 were Pop Warner, with 319 wins from 1895 to 1938 (mostly at Carlisle, Pittsburgh and Stanford), and Amos Alonzo Stagg, with 314 wins from 1890 to 1946 (mostly at Chicago).

By 1970, another six coaches had reached the milestone: Ace Mumford, with 233 wins from 1924 to 1961 (mostly at Southern); Fred T. Long, with 227 wins from 1921 to 1965 (mostly at Wiley); Jess Neely, with 207 wins from 1924 to 1966 (mostly at Clemson and Rice); Cleveland Abbott, with 203 wins at Tuskegee between 1923 and 1954; Jake Gaither, with 204 wins at Florida A&M from 1945 to 1969; and Eddie Anderson, with 201 wins from 1922 to 1964 (mostly at Holy Cross).

Though only eight coaches reached the milestone from 1869 to 1970, 90 coaches have reached the mark since then.

Leaders by category
In overall career wins, the all-time leader is John Gagliardi with 489 wins, mostly at the NCAA Division III level. Gagliardi began his head coaching career at Carroll in Helena, Montana in 1949 and moved in 1953 to Saint John's in Collegeville, Minnesota, where he served until retiring after the 2012 season. Joe Paterno, the head coach at Penn State from 1966 until his 2011 firing in the wake of the Jerry Sandusky child molestation scandal, is second with 409 wins. NCAA sanctions following the scandal had stripped him of all 111 Penn State wins between 1998 and 2011, but the NCAA restored those wins on January 16, 2015 as part of a settlement of a lawsuit by the state of Pennsylvania against the NCAA. Eddie Robinson, head coach at Grambling State from 1941 to 1997 with a two-season hiatus during World War II in which Grambling did not field a team, is third with 408. Bobby Bowden is fourth with 377 wins.

Six others finished their careers with 200 wins and a winning percentage of .800 or greater: Pete Fredenburg (.856) Jake Gaither (.844), Tom Osborne (.836), Mike Kelly (.819), Joe Fincham (.815), and Ron Schipper (.808). Two active coaches have 200 wins and a winning percentage of .800 or greater: Steve Ryan (.835) and Nick Saban (.800).

Among coaches with at least 10 seasons in NCAA Division I and its predecessors, the all-time leaders in wins are Paterno (409), Robinson (408), Bowden (377), Bear Bryant (323), and Pop Warner (319).

Considering wins in Division I FBS only—including wins with "major" programs before the 1978 split of Division I football, and wins in Division I-A/FBS after the split—the all-time leaders are Paterno (409), Bowden (377), Bryant (323), Warner (319), and Amos Alonzo Stagg (314).

The only coaches with 200 Division I FCS wins after the Division I split are Jimmye Laycock (242), Roy Kidd (223), Andy Talley (217), and Jerry Moore (215).

The all-time win leaders in NCAA Division II are Danny Hale (Bloomsburg and West Chester), Gaither and Chuck Broyles, and the all-time win leaders in NCAA Division III are Gagliardi and Kehres.

Among coaches expected to be active in 2022, the career win leaders are Kevin Donley (338), Saban (269), and Mack Brown (265).

The coaches with the most wins at one college are Gagliardi (465 at Saint John's), Paterno (409 at Penn State), Robinson (408 at Grambling), Kehres (332 at Mount Union), Ken Sparks (327 at Carson–Newman), Kidd (314 at Eastern Kentucky), Bowden (304 at Florida State) and Tubby Raymond (300 at Delaware).

Key

Coaches with 200 career wins

Updated through end of 2022 season

Active coaches nearing 200 career wins
''This list identifies active coaches with at least 175 career wins; updated through 2022 season.

See also
 List of college football coaches with 100 losses
 List of college football coaches with 20 ties
 List of college football coaches with 0 career wins
 List of college football coaches with 30 seasons
 List of college football coaches with a .750 winning percentage
 List of college football coaches with 150 NCAA Division I FCS wins, a list restricted to wins while serving as a head coach at the FCS level
 List of National Football League head coaches

Notes

References

200 career wins